The Kalte Bode is the left-hand headstream of the Bode in the High Harz Mountains in the German state of Saxony-Anhalt.

Name
The names of the Warme and Kalte Bode ("Warm" and "Cold" Bode) come from their actual temperature difference of about 2 °C.

Course
The Kalte Bode rises in the Upper Harz at the foot of its highest mountain, the legendary Brocken, in the southern part of the so-called Brockenfeld, on the border with Lower Saxony, north of Braunlage. Immediately nearby are the sources of the Warme Bode, the Ecker and the Oder.  The Kalte Bode flow initially eastwards to Schierke, along the northern slopes of the Wurmberg. In Schierke it changes direction and heads south.

In the Elendstal, a wild and romantic valley between Schierke and Elend, the Kalte Bode has to carry the huge quantities of water that run into this short section of river in spring. A few kilometres beyond Elend it is impounded in the Mandelholz retention basin, before being united with the Warme Bode beyond Königshütte below the ruins of Königsburg to form the Bode.

Tributaries

See also
List of rivers of Saxony-Anhalt

External links
 The Kalte Bode in the Harz 
 The Bode Gorge 

Rivers of Saxony-Anhalt
Rivers of the Harz
Rivers of Germany